Buttwhistle is a 2014 American crime comedy-drama film written and directed by Tenney Fairchild and starring Trevor Morgan, Lio Tipton, Elizabeth Rice, Adhir Kalyan and Thomas Jane.

Cast
 Trevor Morgan as Ogden
 Elizabeth Rice as Beth
 Lio Tipton as Rose
 Adhir Kalyan as Hate Crime John
 Stella Maeve as Missy Blancmange
 Alex Solowitz as Ray Ferzonki
 Katherine LaNasa as Mrs. Confer
 Wallace Langham as Mr. Confer
 Thomas Jane as Grumisch
 Patty McCormack as Grandma Confer
 Griffin Newman as Fenwick
 Blake Robbins as Mr. Blancmange

Release
The film was released theatrically in Los Angeles on April 25, 2014.

Reception
Geoff Berkshire of Variety gave the film a negative review and wrote that it "actually attempts to be an emotionally resonant relationship tale, but lives down to its title by delivering nothing but inane comedy and insufferable drama."

Justin Lowe of The Hollywood Reporter also gave the film a negative review and wrote that it "proves so cryptically scripted and dramatically under-powered that genre characterizations almost fail to do it justice."

Notes

References

External links
 
 

2014 comedy-drama films
2014 crime drama films
2010s American films
2010s crime comedy-drama films
2010s English-language films
American crime comedy-drama films